This list of Ports and harbours in South Africa details the ports, harbours around the coast of South Africa.

List of ports and harbours in South Africa

Ports

South Africa